is a mountain in the Hokkaidō prefecture of Japan. It is located in the Hidaka Mountains range, and its peak is 1,519 meters above sea level.

References
 Google Maps
 Geographical Survey Institute
 Hokkaipedia

Nakano